The Raiffeisen Landesbank Südtirol – Cassa Centrale Raiffeisen dell'Alto Adige is the central banking institute of the 39 independent Casse Rurali/Raiffeisenbank in South Tyrol.

The central bank was related to Raiffeisenverband Südtirol (the association of South Tyrolian Raiffeisen), which is a member of the International Raiffeisen Union, an association of cooperatives based on the ideas of Friedrich Wilhelm Raiffeisen.

The bank formed a joint venture AlpenBank with Raiffeisen-Landesbank Tirol (central institute of Austrian Tyrolian Raiffeisenbank), as well as a sub-holding company Casse Rurali Raiffeisen Finanziaria with Cassa Centrale Banca - Credito Cooperativo del Nord Est, which owned a significant stake in Investitionsbank Trentino Südtirol – Mediocredito Trentino Alto Adige. The Raiffeisen-Landesbank also owned a minority stake in ICCREA Banca, the central institute of Banche di Credito Cooperativo - Casse Rurali ed Artigiane in the whole Italy.

See also

 ICCREA Holding
 Cassa Centrale Banca - Credito Cooperativo del Nord Est

References

External links 
  (in German and Italian)
Investor relations and corporate page in English

Cooperative banks of Italy
Companies based in South Tyrol
Bolzano